Toulose may refer to:

Cyril Toulose, English footballer

See also:
Toulouse